Anastasios Vogiatzis (born 3 April 1936) is a Greek sailor. He competed in the Dragon event at the 1968 Summer Olympics.

References

External links
 

1936 births
Living people
Greek male sailors (sport)
Olympic sailors of Greece
Sailors at the 1968 Summer Olympics – Dragon
Sailors (sport) from Piraeus